Telorta is a genus of moths of the family Noctuidae.

Species
 Telorta acuminata (Butler, 1878)
 Telorta divergens (Butler, 1879)
 Telorta edentata (Leech, 1889)
 Telorta falcipennis Boursin, 1958

References
Natural History Museum Lepidoptera genus database
Telorta at funet

Cuculliinae